Carex salina, also known as saltmarsh sedge, is a species of flowering plant in the sedge family, Cyperaceae. It is native to Eastern Canada, the UK, Norway, and parts of Northern Russia.

See also
 List of Carex species

References

salina
Plants described in 1803
Flora of North America
Flora of Europe